Lukivtsi is a village and rural council in Vyzhnytsia Raion, Chernivtsi Oblast, Ukraine. It belongs to Berehomet settlement hromada, one of the hromadas of Ukraine.

The rural council is composed of five villages: Lipovany (Липовани; Lipoveni), Lukivtsi, Maidan (Майдан; Maidan-Lucavăț), Vakhnivtsi (Вахнівці, Vahnăuți) and Vovchynets (Вовчинець, Volcineț).

References

Villages in Vyzhnytsia Raion